Twyford is a large village and civil parish in the English royal county of Berkshire, with a population of 6,618 people.

History
The village's toponym is Anglo-Saxon in origin, and means double ford. It is a common name in England. Twyford had two fords over two branches of the River Loddon, on the Old Bath Road to the west of the centre. According to the chronicler Geoffrey Gaimar, after King Æthelred of Wessex and his brother, the future King Alfred the Great, were defeated by the Vikings at the Battle of Reading in 871, they escaped by a ford over the River Loddon at Twyford which was not known to their pursuers. William Penn, founder of Pennsylvania, who was a well known philanthropist who donated his life savings to Loddon Village Hall, spent the final years of his life in Ruscombe Fields, a property close to Twyford, and is remembered by a residential street named 'Pennfields'.

Twyford was primarily an agricultural settlement until the coming of the railway in 1838 put it on the Great Western main line to the west and subsequently made it a junction for the Henley Branch Line. However, its position on the Bath Road had always brought activity which was centred on the King's Arms, an important coaching inn.  The opening of a by-pass in 1929 finally ended the east–west flow of main road traffic through the centre, but Twyford is still on a busy north–south route from Wokingham in the south to Henley-on-Thames in the north. The greatest expansion, however, has taken place since the Second World War, particularly in the last 50 years, with the construction of several estates north and south of the village.

Today
Twyford today is largely a commuter settlement for workers travelling to Reading, Maidenhead, Wokingham and, further afield, London. Local commerce and hence employment is limited by its closeness to the major conurbations of Reading and Maidenhead, where there are major shopping facilities. It does, however, have a large Waitrose supermarket, Tesco Express, and other shops, cafes, restaurants and a post office. This makes it the local centre for the northern part of Wokingham district. The village is considered an affluent area where property prices are significantly higher than the national average (probably due to the fact that Twyford provides an easy route to London).

The population of Twyford in the 2011 Census was 6,618. Of this, 20.84% were aged 0–15, while 19.96% were aged 65+, leaving a relatively small working age population compared to the rest of Wokingham Borough. There are 2,611 individual dwellings in the ward of Twyford, the majority of which are detached. In 2011, 72.31% of residents aged 16–74 were in employment, the majority of whom held Managerial, Professional or Technical positions. Only 0.5% were registered as actively seeking employment.

The average life expectancy at birth is 80.1 years for males and 84.7 years for females. Twyford is also home to the global headquarters of the international construction and services company, Interserve, which employs 75,000 people worldwide. Twyford is also a place of great community spirit and has many annual events. Popular in recent years have been the annual Twyford Beer Festival, and Twyfest, which is a week long festival of different events from live music, school discos, quiz nights and talent shows.

Government
Twyford has its own parish council, and is also in the Borough of Wokingham, and the ceremonial county of Berkshire. Before this it was in Wokingham Rural District and the hundred of Charlton. Until 1895 Twyford was part of the parish of Hurst in the liberty of Broad Hinton. From the 13th century until 1844 Broad Hinton was a detached part of Wiltshire.

Twinning
Twyford was twinned with Cuincy in northern France in a ceremony over the weekend of 23–25 March 2018.

Transport
The Great Western Main Line has been electrified and Twyford has been served by a new fleet of electric trains since the start of 2018. These links make Twyford very popular with commuters. A direct rail link to Heathrow Airport is also being planned.

Amenities
Twyford has two recreation grounds, both owned and managed by the Parish Council. The King George V Playing Field, between London Road and Wargrave Road has football pitches, three tennis courts, children's playgrounds, a youth shelter and is where the yearly fireworks are held by Twyford Round Table. A project to build a skate park and ball court in the field was completed in July 2008. Stanlake Meadow, off Waltham Road, has football pitches, a cricket square used by Twyford & Ruscombe Cricket Club and a pavilion which is also used as a nursery school. Twyford also has a youth football club called Twyford Comets which plays on both recreation grounds. Indoor sports clubs use the parish hall, Loddon Hall. This is a joint facility with the neighbouring parish of Ruscombe. Twyford has a tennis club, a cricket club and a bowls club with its own green, and claims to have the oldest badminton club in the country.

In 2015, the Cycle Chilterns project created a cycling guide to Twyford town and the surrounding area with cycling information and facilities, places to visit and a variety of cycle routes. The Twyford Cycling Guide can be downloaded and printed out from the website. Twyford has a number of schools and is also served by grammar schools in Reading. One of the oldest and most popular pubs in Berkshire is located in Twyford. The Duke of Wellington was built around 1450, and early records indicate it has been in use as a public house since the early 17th century. It would then have had a different name as there were no Dukes of Wellington before the nineteenth century. Twyford has a nature reserve on the edge of the village of called Loddon Nature Reserve, under the management of the Berkshire, Buckinghamshire and Oxfordshire Wildlife Trust.

References

Sources

External links

Wokingham Borough Council
Twyford Together
Twyford & District Round Table
 Cycling in Twyford with Cycle Chilterns

 The Duke of Wellington

Civil parishes in Berkshire
Villages in Berkshire
Borough of Wokingham